Zulfiqar Jan (born November 10, 1979, Charsadda, Khyber Pakhtunkhwa) is a First-class Pakistani cricketer. He is a  Right-hand bat and Wicketkeeper and has represented Peshawar cricket team and Khan Research Laboratories cricket team.

References

Pakistani cricketers
Peshawar cricketers
Khan Research Laboratories cricketers
Khyber Pakhtunkhwa cricketers
Peshawar Panthers cricketers
Living people
1979 births
People from Charsadda District, Pakistan